Didymosphaeria taiwanensis is a plant pathogen that causes leaf blast disease of sugarcane.

References

Fungal plant pathogens and diseases
Sugarcane diseases
Leaf diseases
Pleosporales
Fungi described in 1954